William Scott Ketchum (1813–1871), U. S. Army officer before and during the American Civil War.

William Scott Ketchum was born on July 7, 1813 in Norwalk, Connecticut. Graduated from the United States Military Academy, at West Point, New York in 1834.  He served in the Seminole Wars and on the Western frontier.  During the 1857 Cheyenne Expedition of Col. Edwin Vose Sumner against the Cheyenne and the Battle of Solomon's Fork, Captain Ketchum of G Company commanded the 6th Infantry Regiment detachment (of C, D and G Companies).

Civil War
At the start of the Civil War, Major Ketchum now with US Fourth Infantry Regiment commanded Fort Dalles in Oregon, protecting settlers from Indian raids.  He was ordered to San Francisco and then sent to take command of the federal troops in Southern California to protect it from secessionist rising and Confederate invasion from Arizona or Texas.  Headquartered in San Bernardino, California his troops kept an eye on the secessionists of the region and reinforced Fort Yuma.  Relieved by California Volunteer troops, Ketchum and his regiment assembled in San Pedro for the voyage to eastern United States in the late fall of 1861.  Ketchum was promoted to lieutenant colonel in late 1861. He was made a brigadier general of Volunteers in February 1862. For the rest of the war he had staff duties in Washington D.C. and was concerned with inspection, recruiting, and auditing.

Following the Civil War, General Ketchum spent four years on special service in the adjutant general’s office in Washington D.C., then retired in December 1870. He died on June 28, 1871 in Baltimore, Maryland, under suspicious circumstances, the landlady of his boarding house, Ellen G. Wharton being suspected of poisoning him.  She was found not guilty.

In popular culture
The mysterious circumstances surrounding General Ketchum’s death were dramatized in the CBS radio program Crime Classics on 27 July 1953 in the episode entitled ‘The Final Day of General Ketchum’. Ketchum was portrayed by Russell Simpson in the broadcast.

References

1813 births
1873 deaths
People from Norwalk, Connecticut
American military personnel of the Mexican–American War
American people of the Indian Wars
American people of the Seminole Wars
People of Connecticut in the American Civil War
Union Army generals
Military personnel from Connecticut